Ken Armstrong is a senior investigative reporter at ProPublica.

He has worked at The Marshall Project, the Chicago Tribune, The Seattle Times, the Newport News Daily Press, and the Anchorage Times.
He was a 2001 Nieman Fellow at Harvard University, and in 2002, was the McGraw Professor of Writing at Princeton University.

He is married to Ramona Hattendorf; they live in Seattle with their two children, Waters (Emmett) and Meghan.

Awards
 2016 Pulitzer Prize for Explanatory Reporting (with T. Christian Miller)
 2012 Pulitzer Prize for Investigative Reporting (with Michael J. Berens)
 Shared in Pulitzer Prize for breaking news (2010, 2015)
 2011 Edgar Award for non-fiction
 2010 Michael Kelly Award 
 2009 John Chancellor Award Winner 
 2004 Excellence in Legal Journalism Award 
 1999; 2008; 2014; 2015 George Polk Award
 Investigative Reporters and Editors Award six times
 Pulitzer Prize finalist, four times

Works
 (with T. Christian Miller) 
 Scoreboard, Baby: A Story of College Football, Crime, and Complicity, Ken Armstrong, Nick Perry, UNP, Bison Original, 2010, 
 "'Until I Can Be Sure': How the Threat of Executing the Innocent has Transformed the Death Penalty Debate"

References

External links
 

American male journalists
Princeton University faculty
George Polk Award recipients
Living people
Nieman Fellows
Year of birth missing (living people)
The Seattle Times people
Pulitzer Prize for Investigative Reporting winners
Pulitzer Prize for Explanatory Journalism winners